Jean-Baptiste Baujault (born 19 April 1828 in La Crèche, Deux-Sèvres, died in 1899) was a French sculptor.

Biography
The marble statue named Jeune Gaulois, kept at the Musée d'Orsay in Paris belongs to the series of Gauls which occupied much the second half of the 19th century. The mistletoe and the sickle have disappeared.

He participated in the Prix de Rome, but didn't win. He lived and worked in Paris, at Montparnasse and Montmartre, but went into exile in the region of Nantes during the 1870 War.

He held the Légion d'Honneur.

Main works
 Premier Miroir, 1873, marble, Niort, Musée Bernard d'Agesci
 Jeune Gaulois or Au gui l'an neuf!, 1870–1875, marble, Paris, Musée d'Orsay
 Bust of Antoine Chintreuil, 1879, public monument, Septeuil, France

References

1828 births
1899 deaths
People from Deux-Sèvres
Chevaliers of the Légion d'honneur
19th-century French sculptors
French male sculptors
19th-century French male artists